Hibi (written: 日比) is a Japanese surname. Notable people with the surname include:

 George Matsusaburo Hibi (1886–1947), Japanese-American artist
, Japanese politician
 Hisako Hibi (1907–1991), Japanese painter and printmaker, wife of George Matsusaburo Hibi
, Japanese tennis player
, Japanese photographer

Japanese-language surnames